Matheus Tolentino Coelho de Lima (born 12 March 1995), also known as Matheus Paquetá, is a Brazilian professional footballer who plays as an attacking midfielder for Brazilian club Tombense.

He is the brother of professional footballer Lucas Paquetá.

Career

Tombense

2019: Loan to Monza 
On 23 January 2019, Italian Serie C side Monza announced the signing of Paquetà on a six-month loan from Tombense. He came on as a last-minute substitute in a Coppa Italia Serie C match against Pro Vercelli on 6 February.

2020: Loans to CRB and Joinville 
Paquetà was sent on a six-month loan to CRB in the Campeonato Brasileiro Série B on 3 June 2020. He left the club without playing a game.

On 18 September, he was sent on loan to Série D club Joinville, once again without featuring in any match.

2020–2021: Return to Tombense 
Upon his return to Tombense, Paquetà made his Série C debut during the 2020 season, coming on as a substitute in the 87th minute in a 2–0 win over Brusque, on 21 November.

2021–present: Loans to Boavista and Uberlândia 
On 25 June 2021, Paquetà joined Boavista in the Série D on loan. Less than one month later, he moved to fellow-Série D side Uberlândia on loan. Paqueta made his league debut on 24 July, as a starter in a 2–0 win against Águia Negra.

Personal life 
Paquetá's mother is of Portuguese descent. His younger brother, Lucas, is also a professional footballer.

Career statistics

Honours 
Monza
 Coppa Italia Serie C:

References

External links 
 

1995 births
Living people
Footballers from Rio de Janeiro (city)
Brazilian people of Portuguese descent
Brazilian footballers
Association football midfielders
Ceres Futebol Clube players
Tombense Futebol Clube players
Clube Náutico Marcílio Dias players
Avaí FC players
A.C. Monza players
Clube de Regatas Brasil players
Joinville Esporte Clube players
Boavista Sport Club players
Uberlândia Esporte Clube players
Campeonato Brasileiro Série C players
Campeonato Brasileiro Série D players
Brazilian expatriate footballers
Brazilian expatriate sportspeople in Italy
Expatriate footballers in Italy